Dimitri Coats is an American musician, songwriter, producer, and actor.

Music career
Dimitri Coats is best known as the frontman for the hard rock band Burning Brides and as the guitarist in the hardcore punk band Off!. The Brides have released four critically acclaimed albums and have toured with a variety of well-known acts ranging from The White Stripes and My Morning Jacket to Audioslave and A Perfect Circle. Dimitri is the songwriter and producer of the band which he formed with bass player Melanie Coats in 1999, a few years after he dropped out of the Juilliard School's acting program.

As the singer/guitarist for Burning Brides, Coats has twice performed on Conan O'Brien and his songs have been featured in several films, TV shows, and video games such as Guitar Hero.

Coats played guitar on Chris Cornell's 2007 album Carry On and performed the theme song to the 2006 James Bond film, Casino Royale on The Tonight Show with Jay Leno. Coats played drums, guitar, and piano on two songs on Mark Lanegan's Bubblegum album. He contributed to I Got a Brand New Egg Layin' Machine by Goon Moon, a project by Jeordie White and Chris Goss.

In late 2009, Dimitri and Circle Jerks/Black Flag frontman Keith Morris formed the band Off! along with Steven Shane McDonald from Redd Kross and Mario Rubalcaba from Hot Snakes/Rocket From The Crypt. Coats produced the band's first three albums, which he and Morris co-wrote.

Coats is also a member of Ten Commandos with Matt Cameron and Ben Shepherd from Soundgarden, and Alain Johannes.

Acting career
Coats' film debut was Passenger Side (2009) in which he plays the character Goofus. Passenger Side was chosen as one of Canada's top ten feature films of 2009 by the Toronto International Film Festival and was also an official selection of both the 2009 Los Angeles Film Festival and the 2009 London Film Festival.

His next role was the lead villain in the rock and roll vampire comedy Suck (2009). Coats plays Queeny, the head vampire responsible for turning The Winners band into vampires. Suck, which also stars writer/director Rob Stefaniuk, Malcolm McDowell, Dave Foley, Alice Cooper, Iggy Pop, Henry Rollins, Jessica Paré and Moby, premiered at the 2009 Toronto Film Festival and won the People's Choice Award at the 2009 Whistler Film Festival. Two songs from the latest Burning Brides album, Anhedonia, are featured in the film. According to Rolling Stone, "Suck has the potential to become a cult classic like The Rocky Horror Picture Show."

References

American male songwriters
American male actors
Year of birth missing (living people)
Living people
Off! members